Anikó Szebenszky (born August 12, 1965 in Tiszafüred, Jász-Nagykun-Szolnok) is a retired female race walker from Hungary. She competed in two consecutive Summer Olympics for her native country, starting in 1996.

Achievements

Awards
 Hungarian athlete of the Year (1): 1997

References

1965 births
Living people
Hungarian female racewalkers
Athletes (track and field) at the 1996 Summer Olympics
Athletes (track and field) at the 2000 Summer Olympics
Olympic athletes of Hungary